The 2001 WDF World Cup was the 13th edition of the WDF World Cup darts tournament, organised by the World Darts Federation. It was held in Kuala Lumpur, Malaysia.

Men's singles

Women's singles

Other Winners

Final Points Tables

Men

Women

Youth

References

External links
 Results for 2001 World Cup

WDF World Cup darts
2001
WDF World Cup